John Cutting Berry (January 16, 1847 – February 9, 1936) was an American physician and missionary. He was dispatched by the American Board to Japan, where he practiced medicine in places including Kobe, Kyoto, and Okayama. In 1911 he was awarded the Order of the Sacred Treasure, 3rd class.

Life 
Berry was born in the state of Maine in 1847. His father, a captain, died when he was four years old, and he was sent taken in by one of father's friends. He worked for his living from the age of 11. At the age of 17 he was baptized as a Christian. When he was 20, a ship he was riding in was caught in a storm, but he survived. Feeling that God had saved him for a reason, he resolved to dedicate the remainder of his life to God.

In 1871 he graduated from Jefferson Medical College in Philadelphia and was ordained as a missionary by the American Board. He arrived in Japan in June 1872. That July he became the medical director of the International Hospital of Kobe, where he examined poor Japanese people for free if they would listen to him read from the Bible. Berry also established a clinic for the poor in front of Ikuta Shrine in Kobe called , and, along with Japanese doctors, Japan's first charitable hospital,  in Sanda.

On the request of Kanda Takahira, the governor of Hyōgo prefecture, Berry also took charge of Kobe Hospital and undertook other medical activities in Kobe, Himeji, Akashi, Kakogawa, Arima, and Sanda. Berry typically examined between 500 and 700 patients a month and instructed other local doctors on the side. In January 1873, Berry conducted the first human dissection in the prefecture at Kobe Hospital, before an audience of 750 doctors and medical students.

In the autumn of 1873, Berry was requested to personally inspect Kobe's prison, which was suffering an epidemic of beriberi, and was appalled by the unsanitary conditions and inhumane treatment of prisoners within. He appealed to the prefecture's governor to reform its prison system, and several more missionaries followed Berry in inspecting the prison, presenting plans to the Japanese government for prison reform. These actions were the beginning of a prison reform movement with Japan. Berry obtained the permission of Home Lord Ōkubo Toshimichi to inspect the prisons in Osaka, Kyoto, Hyōgo, and Harima, and he prepared a report on the conditions within. This report is thought to have had some influence on the methods used by Japan's system of criminal punishments.

Berry moved to Okayama in 1878, where he strove to reform the prefecture's hospitals. In 1883 he moved to Kyoto, and in 1887 became the head of Doshisha Hospital. He was also involved in the establishment of the hospital's associated women's nursing school, the first women's nursing school in Japan.

In 1893 Berry left Japan and moved back to the U.S., where he practiced eye and ear medicine and acted as a visiting doctor for less well-funded facilities. In 1911 he received the Order of the Sacred Treasure, 3rd class.

Notes

References

Bibliography 

1847 births
1936 deaths
American hospital administrators
Physicians from Maine
American Protestant missionaries
Protestant missionaries in Japan
Jefferson Medical College alumni
Recipients of the Order of the Sacred Treasure, 3rd class
American expatriates in Japan
Christian medical missionaries